Little Big Horn (also known as The Fighting Seventh) is a 1951 American Western film written and directed by Charles Marquis Warren starring Lloyd Bridges, John Ireland and Marie Windsor.

It was also known as The Fighting Seventh.

Plot
Captain Phillip Donlin (Lloyd Bridges) and his small troop must rush to reach Little Big Horn in order to warn General Custer of the Sioux attack that awaits him. As they race against time, and Donlin pushes them hard through an arduous and dangerous journey, the Sioux start taking out the soldiers one at a time. Meanwhile, Donlin also clashes with Lt. John Haywood (John Ireland), who Donlin knows is having an affair with his wife, Celie (Marie Windsor).

Cast
 Lloyd Bridges as Capt. Phillip Donlin 
 John Ireland as Lt. John Haywood
 Marie Windsor as Celie Donlin
 Reed Hadley as Sgt. Maj. Peter Grierson 
 Jim Davis as Cpl. Doan Moylan
 Wally Cassell as Pvt. Danny Zecca
 Hugh O'Brian as Pvt. Al DeWalt
 King Donovan as Pvt. James Corbo
 Richard Emory as Pvt. Mitch Shovels
 John Pickard as Sgt. Vet McCloud
 Richard Sherwood as Pvt. David Mason
 Sheb Wooley as Quince 
 Larry Stewart as Bugler Stevie Williams
 Rodd Redwing as Cpl. Arika (as Rod Redwing)
 Dick Paxton as Pvt. Ralph Hall (as Richard Paxton)
 Gordon Wynn as Pvt. Arndt Hofstetter
 Ted Avery as Pvt. Tim Harvey
 Barbara Woodell as Margaret Owen
 Anne Warren as Anne Owen

Production
It was to be the first of a two-picture deal Charles Marquis Warren had with Republic Pictures. Warren was a leading writer at the time best known for Only the Valiant and he wanted to become a director. The film was called The Black Hills and was to be produced by Joseph Kane and star Rod Cameron. Filming was to start 10 March 1950.

The film eventually shifted to Lippert Pictures. Filming was to have started 7 November 1950. However it was pushed back to February. Lloyd Bridges was the star.

In an interview, Marie Windsor recalled an executive from Lippert Films announced the film had run out of money, with the production having several pages torn out of the script, and the film finished without certain scenes being done.

Reception
The film was a box office hit. It launched Warren's career as a director.

Awards
It was nominated for an award by the Writers Guild of America in 1952.

References

External links

1951 films
Films directed by Charles Marquis Warren
1951 Western (genre) films
Western (genre) cavalry films
American Western (genre) films
Lippert Pictures films
Films scored by Paul Dunlap
1951 directorial debut films
American black-and-white films
1950s English-language films
1950s American films